Maurice (or Moritz, or Maurycy) Dietrich (1816–1887) was Polish pianist and composer of German origin.

Dietrich was born in Saxony. He moved to Polish Łomża and then to Warsaw, where he died.

His compositions are for piano, mainly dances and salon pieces, but include also some opera transcriptions. They were published by Franz Spiess's firm (later passed to Rudolph Friedlein) in Warsaw from the first half of the 1840s on. Later works (from ca.1869) were printed by the André publishing house in Offenbach am Main.

References

External links 

List of works (IMSLP)
 Scores by Maurice Dietrich in digital library Polona

1887 deaths
Polish composers
19th-century Polish pianists
1816 births